"Isn't It Midnight" is a song by the British-American rock band Fleetwood Mac, from their 1987 studio album Tango in the Night. The song was co-written and sung by Christine McVie, with contributions from Lindsey Buckingham and McVie's then-husband Eddie Quintela. "Isn't It Midnight" was the sixth and final single to be released from Tango in the Night in 1988. The cover art for the single features the portrait of Mademoiselle Caroline Rivière. The verse is in E Aeolian with a i-bVII-i-i progression, while the bridge and chorus are in B Aeolian, with a i-bVI-bVII-i progression.

Release
In the United Kingdom, "Isn't It Midnight" was released as the follow-up to "Everywhere"; it charted at a peak position of No. 60 on 18 June 1988. The song performed better in Ireland, where it reached the top 30, peaking at No. 23. The song was also released as a single in the United States as an original album cut and as a live performance taken from the Tango in the Night concert filmed at Cow Palace. The former version reached No. 14 on the Billboard Mainstream Rock chart.

"Isn't It Midnight" was the second official Fleetwood Mac song to be released on the 3-inch CD single format as well being issued on 7" and 12" vinyl. All of the formats included the Tango in the Night track "Mystified", and the CD and 12-inch included the bonus tracks "Say You Love Me" (from 1975; it had previously been included as a bonus track on the "Everywhere" CD single) and "Gypsy" (from the 1982 album Mirage).

The song was featured consistently throughout Fleetwood Mac's Tango in the Night and Behind the Mask concert tours, though it was not played after 1990 until 2015 when it was played at selected Fleetwood Mac concerts.

Alternate versions

There are two alternate mixes of the song, one featured on the 1992 four-disc retrospective 25 Years – The Chain, and one on the Tango in the Night deluxe set released in 2017. Both versions of the song have a sparser synth-driven arrangement with a lack of select electric guitar and backing vocal passages from Lindsey Buckingham. The mix featured on 25 Years – The Chain is also included on the 1992 CD single "Love Shines".

Reception
In a retrospective review, Alexis Petridis of The Guardian described "Isn't It Midnight" as an example of McVie's "bullet-proof" songwriting, a "confection of booming drums, precise, tinkly synth and wailing guitar solos that sounds as if it’s just waiting to appear in the background of a film starring Ally Sheedy." David Bowling of Blogcritics Magazine also grouped it as one of Christine McVie's strongest songs, noting that McVie delivers an atypical vocal in a song "about as hard as this incarnation of Fleetwood Mac gets". Upon reflection, Stevie Nicks considers the track, along with Buckingham's own songs on the album, as a representative of his best contributions to any Fleetwood Mac album.

Track listings
UK 7-inch single – Warner: W 7860

A1. "Isn't It Midnight" – 4:06
B1. "Mystified" – 3:06 

UK 12-inch single – Warner: W 7860 (T) and UK 3 inch CD single – Warner: W 7860 (CD)

A1. "Isn't It Midnight" – 4:06
A2. "Mystified" – 3:06
B1. "Say You Love Me" – 4:11
B2. "Gypsy" – 4:24

Personnel
 Christine McVie – lead and backing vocals, synthesizers
 Lindsey Buckingham – guitars, Fairlight CMI, backing vocals
 John McVie – bass guitar
 Mick Fleetwood – drums, percussion

Chart positions

References

The Great Rock Discography, 6th Edition, Martin C. Strong.

External links
 Fleetwood Mac Legacy 

Fleetwood Mac songs
1988 singles
Songs written by Christine McVie
Song recordings produced by Richard Dashut
Songs written by Lindsey Buckingham
1987 songs
Warner Records singles